The Sheepman is a 1958 American Western comedy film directed by George Marshall and starring Glenn Ford, Shirley MacLaine, and Leslie Nielsen.

Plot
Gambler Jason Sweet (Ford) wins a flock of sheep in a poker game and proceeds to take them by train into the middle of cattle country. Before long, the townsfolk take notice (and object), but Sweet is more than up to the challenge.

The first thing he does is pick a fight with the roughest, toughest man around, "Jumbo" McCall (Mickey Shaughnessy), and beats him up. He also reveals himself to be an expert with a gun. Dell Payton (Shirley MacLaine) does not know what to make of him, but is attracted to him, as he is to her. Her fiancé, local cattle baron "Colonel" Steven Bedford (Nielsen), is troubled by this and also because he and Sweet know each other. The newcomer recognizes Bedford as an old acquaintance named Johnny Bledsoe, a card shark and gunfighter gone respectable.

When Bedford finds himself losing their battle for domination, despite initially having the whole town behind him, he sends for professional gunman Chocktaw Neal (Pernell Roberts). Chocktaw and his two buddies all have grudges against Sweet. Chocktaw tries to goad Sweet into a shootout, but Sweet spots Chocktaw's friends waiting in ambush, aiming at him with their rifles. Dell and Milt Masters (Edgar Buchanan) are able to disarm them, and Chocktaw, suddenly aware he is alone in the plan, panics and draws on Sweet but loses and dies. The final showdown then comes down to Bedford and Sweet (who is faster and smarter) and Bedford ends up dead, followed by his henchmen surrendering.

Later, to Dell's utter astonishment, Sweet sells the sheep so he can buy cattle. He explains that he only kept them because he refused to be pushed around by anybody. The couple then rides away.

Cast
 Glenn Ford as Jason Sweet
 Shirley MacLaine as Dell Payton 
 Leslie Nielsen as "Colonel" Stephen Bedford / Johnny Bledsoe
 Mickey Shaughnessy as "Jumbo" McCall
 Edgar Buchanan as Milt Masters
 Willis Bouchey as Frank Payton, Dell's father
 Pernell Roberts as Chocktaw Neal
 Slim Pickens as Marshal, who goes fishing whenever there is likely to be trouble
 Robert 'Buzz' Henry as Red
 Pedro Gonzalez Gonzalez as Angelo, one of Sweet's shepherds
 Richard Alexander as Barfly (uncredited)
 Tom London as Townsman (uncredited)

Box office
According to MGM records, the film earned $1,535,000 in the US and Canada and $2.2 million elsewhere, resulting in a profit of $976,000.

Award nominations
William Bowers and James Edward Grant were nominated for an Oscar for Best Writing, Story and Screenplay - Written Directly for the Screen.

The two BAFTA nominations were: Best Film from any source, and Glenn Ford for Best Foreign Actor.

References

External links

 
 
 
 

1958 films
1958 comedy films
1950s Western (genre) comedy films
American Western (genre) comedy films
1950s English-language films
Films directed by George Marshall
Metro-Goldwyn-Mayer films
CinemaScope films
1950s American films